This is a list of the National Register of Historic Places listings in Dawson County, Texas.

This is intended to be a complete list of properties and districts listed on the National Register of Historic Places in Dawson County, Texas. One district is listed on the National Register in the county.

Current listings

The locations of National Register properties and districts may be seen in a mapping service provided.

|}

See also

National Register of Historic Places listings in Texas
Recorded Texas Historic Landmarks in Dawson County

References
 

Dawson County, Texas
Dawson County
Buildings and structures in Dawson County, Texas